Bango is a music style created and made popular on the East African coast by Joseph Ngala. It fuses traditional Portuguese music genres, Arabic influenced taarab music, jazz and music genres of local coastal Bantu languages. It resembles easy listening music styles of Latin America such as bossa nova and music styles of many Indian Ocean islands such as Seychelles and Mauritius. Ngala (also known by stage name "Mzee Ngala") is a renowned Kenyan bango musician who comes from Freretown, Mombasa, and also the founder of the genre. He performed in the past with famous groups such as the Hodi Boys and was also the founder and band leader of the 1960s and 1970s group Bahari Boys. In the band, he was the main composer and inspiration. Mzee Ngala's song "Bango" is the originator of the name bango. The resilience of the name, bango, is testament to the genre created by Ngala.

Other notable bango artists who have copied his style include Uyoga Band (formerly Them Mushrooms), Teusi 5 and Bango Sounds. Ngala still  performs his music during events like the bi-annual Coast Night held in Nairobi and also in events all over the Coast province like Jamboree Club. Many, though not all, bango songs are written and performed for and during weddings. Such songs include "Jimmy na Anne" (written for Jimmy Ngala, Mzee Ngala's son's wedding to Anna), "Billy na Susan", "Kombe na Dogo" and the "David na Vera".

References 

East African music